John Billingsley (1747–1811) was an agricultural pioneer in 18th century Somerset, England.

The writer of the 1794 Survey of Somerset, Billingsley was a leading agriculturalist who was one of the founders of the Bath and West Society, known today as the Royal Bath and West of England Society. He lived all his life at Ashwick Grove.

Family life 

He was born in 1747, the grandson of Nicholas Billingsley, a Presbyterian dissenter who was minister at Ashwick from 1699 to 1729. Little is known about his early life but by 1782, he was listed as Brewer along with Ryan Gosling of the Oakhill Brewery in the neighbouring village of Oakhill, and may have been involved in the wool trade before that.

He was described as a leading member of the Presbyterian church although at some stage he was reconciled with the Church of England.

General View of the Agriculture of the County of Somerset 

The 18th century was largely one of peace in Somerset, but the Industrial Revolution in the Midlands and Northern England spelled the end for most of Somerset's cottage industries. Despite this, 20 years later John Billingsley conducted a survey, for the Board of Agriculture, of the county's agriculture in 1795 and found that agricultural methods could still be improved. He provided estimates, based on his local knowledge, of the land use of the one million acres (4,000 km2) in the county. He suggested that 584,500 were enclosed meadow and pasture land, 260,000 were enclosed arable and convertible land with smaller areas for other purposes.  were considered uncultivated wastes.

It advocated ways of modernising farming practices, particularly through mechanisation, which including instructions for hedge building and crop rotation (also how to treat sick animals with hay tea and improve cucumber production with horse dung!). It also includes a chapter on political economy related to the narrow margin of British food supplies, in view of the outbreak of war with France in 1793, and mentions developments on the Somerset coalfield.

His General View of the Agriculture of the County of Somerset divided the county into three districts- north-east, middle and south-west. It included proposals for the enclosure of Exmoor and the building of a village at Simonsbath. For the middle section the plans he advocated improved drainage, including the straightening of sections of the rivers Brue, Axe and Parrett, were more successful and lead to some significant reclamation of the Somerset Levels. He also deplored the failure of many farmers to manure the land, exhausting it by constant cropping and overstocking.

In 1798 he wrote about the water-meadows of the Brendon and Quantock Hills describing them as the best in the country.

Other activities 

Billingsley was also actively involved in turnpike trusts, and canal building, including the Kennet and Avon Canal, Somerset Coal Canal and the Dorset and Somerset Canal. One eulogy by Sir Benjamin Hobhouse, President of the Bath and West Society, exaggerates considerably, referring to him as having "drained Sedgemoor and enclosed Mendip"!

He was also responsible for the introduction and adoption of the double-furrow plough.

Atthill considers that his greatest achievement was the enclosure of the Mendip Hills. The first Mendip commons to be enclosed were those in the parishes of East and West Cranmore, which had been completed by 1769. By 1794, Billingsley estimated that  had been enclosed by Dry stone walls, leaving 11,550 unenclosed.

Memorials 

At the west end of the aisles in the Church of St James, Ashwick two memorial tablets can be seen. These are dedicated to John Billingsley, his wife Mary, and their family.

Soon after his death the Bath and West Society commissioned Samuel Woodforde (the nephew of James Woodforde) to copy in oils a crayon portrait of Billingsly. Another portrait by Joseph Hutchinson now hangs in the Victoria Art Gallery in Bath.

References 

1747 births
1811 deaths
English agriculturalists
History of Somerset
People from Mendip District
18th-century English farmers
19th-century English farmers